Charles H. Smith (March 7, 1826 – February 4, 1898) was a Union Navy sailor in the American Civil War and a recipient of the U.S. military's highest decoration, the Medal of Honor, for his actions aboard the .

Biography
Smith was born March 7, 1826, in Standish, Maine, Jones was living in Maine when he joined the U.S. Navy.

Smith died September 4, 1900, in Concord, Vermont. He is buried in Ocean View Cemetery, Wells, Maine.

Medal of Honor citation
Smith's official Medal of Honor citation reads:
Rank and organization: Coxswain, U.S. Navy. Born: 1826, Maine. Accredited to: Maine. G.O. No.: 59, 22 June 1865. 
After the Monitor sprang a leak and went down, Smith courageously risked his life in a gallant attempt to rescue members of the crew. Although he, too, lost his life during the hazardous operation, he had made every effort possible to save the lives of his fellow men.''.

See also
List of American Civil War Medal of Honor recipients: Q–S

References

1826 births
1898 deaths
People of Maine in the American Civil War
Union Navy sailors
United States Navy Medal of Honor recipients
American Civil War recipients of the Medal of Honor
People from Standish, Maine